Charles Joseph John Anthony Ignace Felix of Lorraine, also known as Charles III in his capacity as the bishop of Olomouc (24 November 1680 – 4 December 1715), was a German prelate.

Born in Vienna, he was the second son of Charles V, Duke of Lorraine. He was bishop of Olomouc (1695–1711) and Prince-Bishop of Osnabrück (1698–1715), for which he was the successful candidate of the House of Palatinate, opposed by Brandenburg and, following some reverses and to the accompaniment of an enormous payment to the chapter of Trier, Charles Joseph was made archbishop and prince-elector of Trier (1711–1715), a political position of notable importance in the Holy Roman Empire. Already in 1711, he was able to make use of his electoral rights in the election of Charles VI, Holy Roman Emperor. He participated in the negotiations surrounding the end of the War of the Spanish Succession and succeeded in having the French occupying forces leave the Archbishopric in 1714. Charles Joseph died of smallpox during a visit in Vienna.

Bibliography
Alessandro Cont, La Chiesa dei principi. Le relazioni tra Reichskirche, dinastie sovrane tedesche e stati italiani (1688–1763), preface of Elisabeth Garms-Cornides, Trento, Provincia autonoma di Trento, 2018, pp. 117-137

References
 Genealogy of the House of Lorraine (in French)
 Allgemeine Deutsche Biographie, vol. 15, p. 365-366

External links

1680 births
1715 deaths
Clergy from Vienna
Charles 03
Charles 03
Deaths from smallpox
House of Lorraine
Infectious disease deaths in Austria
Roman Catholic Prince-Bishops of Osnabrück
Princes of Lorraine
17th-century French people
18th-century French people
Nobility from Vienna
Burials at the Imperial Crypt